The Battle of Korea Strait was a single ship action fought on the first day of the Korean War, 25–26 June 1950, between the navies of South Korea and North Korea. A North Korean troop transport carrying hundreds of soldiers attempted to land its cargo near Busan but was encountered by a South Korean patrol ship and sunk. It was one of the first surface actions of the war and resulted in an important South Korean victory.

Battle

The Korean War began on 25 June 1950 with a massive North Korean invasion of South Korea which nearly overran the country. During the invasion, a North Korean steamer was assigned to insert troops along the peninsula's southeastern coast. The merchant ship of 1,000 tons was armed with machine guns and loaded with 600 soldiers of the 766th Independent Infantry Regiment.

It was early morning when the Republic of Korea Navy submarine chaser ROKS Bak Du San spotted the lone enemy steamer eighteen miles from Busan. The chaser, also formerly American, was the lead vessel of the South Korean Navy.

Bak Du San first challenged the steamer with signal lights and received no response. But when the South Koreans turned on their searchlights, the North Koreans opened fire, hitting the Bak Du Sans bridge. The helmsman was killed and the officer of the deck seriously wounded. Bak Du San returned fire with her main 3-inch anti-aircraft gun and six .50-caliber machine guns. After the North Koreans began taking hits, they attempted to flee the engagement, but were chased by the Bak Du San in a running battle that ended with the steamer being sunk near Tsushima Island, with heavy loss of life.

The victory was a major strategic gain. Busan was vital but only lightly defended, and if it had fallen the North Koreans would have been one step closer to completely overrunning the country.

See also
 List of single-ship actions

Notes

References
 

Korea Strait
June 1950 events in Asia
Korea Strait
Battles and operations of the Korean War in 1950 
Battles of the Korean War involving South Korea
Battles of the Korean War involving North Korea
Naval battles involving North Korea